The Southern Shore Region is located in the South Jersey region of New Jersey. It is one of six tourism regions established by the New Jersey State Department of Tourism, the others are the Gateway Region, Greater Atlantic City, the Delaware River Region, the Shore Region. and the Skylands Region. The area includes Cape May County and Cumberland County. The coast is along the Atlantic Ocean and Delaware Bay, while the inland areas are part of the New Jersey Pine Barrens.

Places

Cape May
Cape May – Lewes Ferry
The Wildwoods
Ocean City
The Pine Barrens
New Jersey Pinelands National Reserve
The Glades (New Jersey)
Bear Swamp, New Jersey

Points of interest
Cape May Seashore Lines
National Register of Historic Places listings in Cumberland County, New Jersey 
National Register of Historic Places listings in Cape May County, New Jersey 
Vineland has the only remaining drive-in theater,The Delsea Drive-In, in the state of New Jersey, the state in which they were created in 1932.  It is located on Route 47 (Delsea Drive) north of County Route 552.
 Corson's Inlet State Park
 The Wetlands Institute
 Higbee Beach Wildlife Management Area
 Tuckahoe Wildlife Management Area
The Vineland Haunted house is also a tourist attraction. In the late 70s a family moved in and encountered several paranormal problems. Including a gravestone moving across a field by itself when it would take 4 or more strong people to move it.

Events
Lima Bean Festival
Water and Wings Festival
Southern Shore Music Festival
 Wildwoods Country Music Weekend October 22–23, 2010

See also
Atlantic coastal plain
Kechemeche
South Jersey
Regions of New Jersey
Garden State Parkway
New Jersey Coastal Heritage Trail Route

Notes

External links
Cumberland County's official website

Regions of New Jersey
Geography of Cumberland County, New Jersey
Geography of Cape May County, New Jersey
Economy of New Jersey
Tourism in New Jersey
Tourism regions of New Jersey